Dolichoderus tauricus is an extinct species of Miocene ant in the genus Dolichoderus. Described by Dlussky in 1981, the fossils were found in Russia.

References

†
Miocene insects
Prehistoric insects of Europe
Fossil taxa described in 1981
Fossil ant taxa